Little Rock Township may refer to the following townships in the United States:

 Little Rock Township, Kendall County, Illinois
 Little Rock Township, Nobles County, Minnesota